The 1970 New York Jets season was the 11th season for the team and the first in the National Football League, following the AFL–NFL merger. It began with the team trying to maintain or improve upon its 10–4 record from 1969 under head coach Weeb Ewbank. The Jets finished with a record of 4–10. 
One of the highlights of the season was the Jets' first game when they appeared on the first ever Monday Night Football game vs. the Cleveland Browns. The Jets lost the game 31–21.
In the fifth game of the season, quarterback Joe Namath was lost for the season when he broke his wrist vs. the Baltimore Colts in Shea Stadium, the first meeting between the teams since Namath guaranteed victory in Super Bowl III. Namath's injury occurred when he hit his hand on the helmet of Colts defensive tackle Fred Miller. With Namath on the sidelines, the Jets were forced to play untested Al Woodall, who guided New York to upsets of NFC powerhouses Los Angeles and Minnesota, but only one other victory, over the lowly Boston Patriots.

Roster

Schedule

Intra-division opponents are in bold text.

Standings

External links
1970 statistics

New York Jets seasons
New York Jets
New York
1970s in Queens